Georgian bread is bread from the country of Georgia. პური (puri) means bread in Georgian. Varieties of Georgian bread include

Tonis puri
Shotis puri
Khachapuri

Cuisine of Georgia (country)
Breads